The 2013 Sparkassen Open was a professional tennis tournament played on clay courts. It was the 20th edition of the tournament which was part of the 2013 ATP Challenger Tour. It took place in Braunschweig, Germany between 1 and 7 July 2013.

Singles main-draw entrants

Seeds

 1 Rankings are as of June 25, 2013.

Other entrants
The following players received wildcards into the singles main draw:
  Andreas Beck
  Jan Hájek
  Peter Heller
  Florian Mayer

The following players received entry as a special exempt into the singles main draw:
  Máximo González

The following players received entry from the qualifying draw:
  Filip Krajinović
  Nils Langer
  Goran Tošić
  Alexander Ward

The following player received entry as a lucky loser:
  Ivo Minář

Doubles main-draw entrants

Seeds

1 Rankings as of June 25, 2013.

Other entrants
The following pairs received wildcards into the doubles main draw:
  Marek Pešička /  Jiří Veselý
  Nils Langer /  Jan-Lennard Struff
  Andrey Golubev /  Ivan Sergeyev

Champions

Singles

 Florian Mayer def.  Jiří Veselý 4–6, 6–2, 6–1

Doubles

 Tomasz Bednarek /  Mateusz Kowalczyk def.  Andreas Siljeström /  Igor Zelenay 6–2, 7–6(7–4)

External links
Official Website

Sparkassen Open
Sparkassen Open
2013 in German tennis